Max Clegg (born 11 April 1997) is a British speedway rider.

Career 
Born in Brighouse, Yorkshire, Clegg started racing in grasstrack at the age of seven, moving on to speedway in his teens and becoming team mascot for Sheffield Tigers. He finished second in the British Under-15 500cc Championship in 2011, and made his National League debut in 2012 for Scunthorpe Saints. In 2013 he moved to Dudley Heathens, and was part of the team that won the National League, National League Knock-out Cup, and National Shield titles. He was given a Premier League debut by Sheffield Tigers in the last meeting of their 2013 season.

In 2013 he was included in the draft for Elite League reserve places, and was picked by Leicester Lions. He made his Elite League debut on 29 March 2014 against Wolverhampton Wolves, still aged 16.

In December 2014 he signed again for Cradley Heathens for 2015, this time as the team's number one rider and captain. In 2016 he won both the British Under-19 Championship and the National League Riders Championship.

In 2022, he re-joined and rode for the Leicester Lions in the SGB Championship 2022.

References

1997 births
Living people
People from Brighouse
English motorcycle racers
British speedway riders
Cradley Heathens riders
Leicester Lions riders
Scunthorpe Saints riders
Sportspeople from Yorkshire